The 2012 Budapest Grand Prix was a women's tennis tournament played on outdoor clay courts. It was the 18th edition of the Budapest Grand Prix, an International-level tournament on the 2012 WTA Tour. It took place at the Római Tennis Academy in Budapest, Hungary, from 30 April through 5 May 2012. First-seeded Sara Errani won the singles title.

Singles main draw entrants

Seeds

 1 Rankings are as of April 23, 2012

Other entrants
The following players received wildcards into the singles main draw:
  Csilla Borsányi
  Henrietta Habler
  Vanda Lukács

The following players received entry from the qualifying draw:
  Akgul Amanmuradova
  Melinda Czink
  Mervana Jugić-Salkić
  Jasmina Tinjić

Withdrawals
  María José Martínez Sánchez
  Lucie Šafářová

Retirements
  Akgul Amanmuradova (right elbow injury)
  Varvara Lepchenko (right ankle injury)
  Jasmina Tinjić (difficulty breathing)

Doubles main draw entrants

Seeds

1 Rankings are as of April 23, 2012

Other entrants
The following pair received wildcard into the doubles main draw:
  Gréta Arn /  Tímea Babos

Retirements
  Gréta Arn (neck injury)
  Marina Erakovic (left abdominal injury)

Finals

Singles

 Sara Errani defeated  Elena Vesnina, 7–5, 6–4
It was Errani's 3rd title of the year and 5th of her career, extending her clay winning streak to 15 matches.

Doubles

 Janette Husárová /  Magdaléna Rybáriková defeated  Eva Birnerová /  Michaëlla Krajicek, 6–4, 6–2

References

External links
Official website

Budapest Grand Prix
Budapest Grand Prix
Buda
Buda